is a 2008 Japanese comedy film written and directed by Yosuke Fujita. It is about two friends who are about to turn 30 and who fall in love with the same girl.

Plot
It pictures various people who are weak in terms of social adaptability comparatively in the comical by the warm look.

Teruo Tooyama ( Yoshiyoshi Arakawa ), 29 years old, is working as a non-regular worker in landscape gardening, while living with his father who runs a secondhand bookstore.
During his time off, he enjoys making mechanisms to scare and surprise other people with his friend Hisanobu Komori ( Yoshinori Okada ) who is an office worker.
But Komori feels a little impatient, becoming 29 years old.

In some case, Teruo's father ( Keizo Kanie ) comes to develop depression, and Teruo now runs the secondhand bookstore instead of his father.
To recover, his father, who was asleep for a while, went out to travel and roam.

Akari Kinoshita ( Yoshino Kimura ) is a mysterious woman who is interested in the homeless woman artist who lives on the shore of the river. She paints pictures, observing the homeless woman as her hobby.
She comes to interview at a company which is responsible for cleaning medical care environments, which is where Komori works. Komori, who conducted the interview by chance, employs her.

Akari is troubled by learning to work because her fingers are clumsy.
In one case, she is asked to push the elevator switch for the luggage, but she broke a bone in her forefinger due to impatience.
Moreover, while cleaning the floor of an operating room, on the blood, she has been slimy and has laid the medical instrument.
Therefore, she quit her job after consulting her boss.
Komori is so anxious for Akari that he calls on her at her apartment and suggests that she work at Teruo's secondhand bookstore.

Teruo grows to like Akari for helping him at the store and develops a love for her. 
Komori's love for Akari also grows stronger at the same time.

One day, an antique restoration craftsman named Yuhara ( Naoki Tanaka ) visits the secondhand bookstore.
He saw a painting in the store. He asked Akari if he could buy the painting, liking the picture which Akari had painted, but she refused his request as it was not for sale.
But she runs after Yuhara, holding the painting, feeling anxious about his words. She then sells the painting to Yuhara.
This thing becomes a chance and Akari and Yuhara come to associate.

Akari moves to the old city of Nara with Yuhara, who will learn restoration techniques for Buddhist statues.
Teruo and Komori go to Nara to visit Akari and Yuhara and they spend delightful days together.

Awards

It won the Audience Award at the 2008 New York Asian Film Festival and the Nippon Connection Grand Prize.

References

External links 
 
 

2008 films
2000s Japanese-language films
2000s Japanese films